The Triumph 1500 is a small front-wheel drive car that was produced by  Standard-Triumph from 1970 to 1973. In 1973 it was revised as the Triumph 1500TC becoming rear-wheel drive. Production ended in 1976, by which time it had been replaced by the Triumph Dolomite.

1500 
Whilst retaining the front-wheel drive of the Triumph 1300, the body featured a restyled nose, a lengthened tail, twin headlights, horizontally mounted rear light clusters and a larger boot. The interior was also restyled featuring a new design of dashboard and door cards but retaining the wooden door cappings. The suspension used coil springs all round and was independent at the front, incorporating a dead-beam rear axle at the back, which represented something of a technological retreat from the all-independent suspension offered by the 1300. These later cars also had a silver nose badge. Earlier cars had a black nose badge.

1500TC 
In October 1973, the 1500 was renamed the 1500TC. It retained the same 1493 cc engine (now with twin SU carburettors) mated to the rear wheel drive drivetrain from the recently introduced Triumph Dolomite. The interior and exterior styling remained largely the same. The 1500TC can be identified by the "1500TC" bootlid badge and the black centres on the wheel trims, which were blue on the 1500.

The 1500TC was replaced by the Dolomite 1500/1500HL in March 1976.

The car was capable of reaching a top speed of 92 mph (148 km/h) and could accelerate from 0–60 mph in 14.0 seconds (0–100 km/h in 14.8 seconds).

A sunroof option was available.

Appendices

Publications

References

See also 
 

Compact executive cars
Front-wheel-drive vehicles
Rear-wheel-drive vehicles
1500
Cars introduced in 1970
Sedans
Cars discontinued in 1976